The 23rd American Society of Cinematographers Awards were held on February 15, 2009, honoring the best cinematographers of film and television in 2008.

Winners and nominees

Film
  Anthony Dod Mantle – Slumdog Millionaire
 Roger Deakins – Revolutionary Road
 Roger Deakins and Chris Menges – The Reader
 Claudio Miranda – The Curious Case of Benjamin Button
 Wally Pfister – The Dark Knight

Television

Outstanding Achievement in Cinematography in Regular Series
 Nelson Cragg – CSI: Crime Scene Investigation (Episode: "For Gedda")
 Ousama Rawi – The Tudors (Episode: "Everything Is Beautiful")
 Stephen Reizes – Flashpoint (Episode: "Who's George?")
 Gale Tattersall – House (Episode: "House's Head")
 Glen Winter – Smallville (Episode: "Fracture")

Outstanding Achievement in Cinematography in Miniseries or Pilot
 David Stockton – Eleventh Hour (Episode: "Resurrection")
 Oliver Bokelberg – My Own Worst Enemy (Episode: "Breakdown")
 Michael Bonvillain – Fringe (Episode: "Pilot")
 Jon Joffin – The Andromeda Strain (Episode: "Part 1")
 Kramer Morgenthau – Life on Mars (Episode: "Out Here in the Fields")

References

2008 film awards
2008 guild awards
2008
American
2008 in American cinema